Jefferson Middle School may refer to one of several different educational institutions, including:

Jefferson Leadership Academies (formerly Thomas Jefferson Middle School), Long Beach, California
Jefferson Middle School (Oceanside, California)
Jefferson Middle School (San Gabriel, California)
Jefferson Middle School (Merritt Island, FL)
Jefferson Middle School (Champaign, Illinois), Champaign, Illinois
Jefferson Middle School (Midland, MI)
Jefferson Middle School (Columbia, MS), Columbia, Mississippi
Jefferson Middle School (Columbia, Missouri), Columbia, Missouri
Jefferson Middle School (St. Charles, MO), St. Charles, Missouri
Jefferson Middle School (Albuquerque, New Mexico), Albuquerque, New Mexico
Jefferson Middle School (Jefferson City, Tennessee), Jefferson City, Tennessee
Jefferson Middle School (Oak Ridge, Tennessee), Oak Ridge, Tennessee
Jefferson Middle School, Arlington, Virginia
Jefferson Middle School (Madison, Wisconsin), Madison, Wisconsin
Jefferson Middle School (Olympia, Washington), Olympia, Washington

See also
 Thomas Jefferson Middle School (disambiguation)